Abraham Wood (1752 –1804)  was one of the first American composers.

Wood was born in Massachusetts Bay Colony and was a drummer during the American Revolutionary War.  He wrote Warren to commemorate the army officer Joseph Warren (1741–1775), who died courageously in the Battle of Bunker Hill and he wrote A Hymn on Peace to commemorate the Treaty of Paris that officially ended the Revolutionary War. This work was circulated as single pamphlet instead of part of a larger collection of sacred pieces, which was more common of the time.

Scores
Volume 6. Abraham Wood, The Collected Works, edited by Karl Kroeger. 144 pages, .

List of works
Worcester (How beauteous are their feet)MIDI
Marlborough MIDI
Warren
A Hymn on Peace
Brevity (Man, born of woman)
Walpole

Discography
"A Hymn on Peace" and  "Warren" on The Birth of Liberty - New World Records
"Brevity (Man, born of woman)", "Walpole", and "Worcester (How beauteous are their feet)" on Early American Choral Music Volume 2'' Anglo-American Psalmody 1550-1800 on Harmonia Mundi

References

1752 births
1804 deaths
American male composers
American composers